Jochiwon station is a railway station in Jochiwon-eup, Sejong City, South Korea.

Station 
It serves two railway lines: the Gyeongbu Line and the Chungbuk Line. There are three platforms for five tracks and a container yard for freight trains.

All Mugunghwa-ho trains and most of the ITX-Saemaeul trains stop here.

References 

Railway stations in Sejong